Larry "Juice" Douglas was a professional American football wide receiver/tight end who played in the National Football League (NFL) for the Pittsburgh Steelers (1979), the Canadian Football League for the Winnipeg Blue Bombers (1980), and the United States Football League for three teams, including the Chicago Blitz (1983), Arizona Wranglers (1983–84), and Birmingham Stallions (1985–86).

Douglas appeared for the Steelers in the 1979 preseason, but spent the regular season on injured reserve as Pittsburgh went on to win Super Bowl XIV.

References

American football wide receivers
Pittsburgh Steelers players
Winnipeg Blue Bombers players
Chicago Blitz players
Arizona Wranglers players
Birmingham Stallions players
Living people
Year of birth missing (living people)